Kate Goehring is an American stage, film and television actress.

Early life 
Goehring grew up on Mason's Island. Her father, Edmund Goehring, Sr., was a Commander in the Navy in World War II and a vice president of sales for an electronics company. Her mother, Helen Goehring, is a writer and retired development director.

Goehring graduated from Oberlin College with a degree in American Romantic Fiction.

Career

Film and television
Goehring co-starred in the independent feature Swimmers, as well as appearing on Law & Order, Law & Order: Special Victims Unit and Law & Order: Criminal Intent. She starred opposite David Jason as Detective Grace Wallace in ITV's March in Windy City. Other co-starring roles include Stella, Gossip Girl, One Life to Live, ER, and The Untouchables. Goehring also originated the character of Magenta in the video game Grand Theft Auto V. She was nominated for a Chicago local Emmy for her performance in John Logan's Moment of Rage, starring Denis O'Hare.

Theater
Goehring first garnered notice for her Chicago performance in Christopher Durang's Laughing Wild for which she won a Joseph Jefferson Citation.  She played Harper Pitt in Tony Kushner's first national tour of Angels in America, which earned her a Miami Carbonell Award. Goehring was most recently in the Broadway production of "The Inheritance", directed by Stephen David Daldry.

Early on in Chicago, Goehring was nominated for a Joseph Jefferson Award for Candida at the Court Theatre. She worked with the Court Theatre, Goodman Theatre, Victory Gardens Theater, Northlight Theatre, and Bailiwick Repertory Theatre.

She also recently played Eleanor of Aquitane in the Folger Shakespeare Library production of Shakespeare's "The Life and Death of King John", and Lady Bracknell in "The Importance of Being Earnest" at New York Classical Theatre. Other work in regional theaters includes the Intiman, A Contemporary Theatre, Arena Stage, the McCarter Theatre, the Huntington Theatre Company, the Triad Stage, and Milwaukee Repertory. She played Bella opposite Judy Kaye in Lost in Yonkers at the Arizona Theatre Company.

Awards
Goehring has received the following:

 Broadway World/Raleigh Award, Best Actress in a Play: Wit Joseph Jefferson Citation Winner: Laughing Wild After Dark Award: Laughing Wild Joseph Jefferson Award nomination: Candida 
 Joseph Jefferson Award nomination: Angels in America Carbonell Award/Principal Actress: Angels in America, National Tour
 Leon Rabin Award/Actress in a Leading Role: Experiment with an Airpump Chicago Midwest Emmy nomination for Best Supporting Actress: Moment of Rage Seattle Footlights Award/Principal Actress: Collected Stories''

References

External links
Broadway World

http://www.abouttheartists.com/artists/85484-kate-goehring

Actresses from Chicago
American film actresses
American stage actresses
Living people
American television actresses
Year of birth missing (living people)
21st-century American women